Lorenzo Burzigotti (born 12 March 1987) is an Italian footballer who plays for Sansepolcro.

Biography
Born in Sansepolcro, the Province of Arezzo, Burzigotti started his career at Sansepolcro, then signed by Arezzo in mid-2004. In mid-2006 he graduated from the under-20 youth team and loaned to Sansovino. In January 2007 he was transferred to Juve Stabia but only played 9 times combined that season. On 31 August 2007 he was sold to South Tyrol in co-ownership deal. He only played 3 times in 2007–08 Serie C2. Arezzo gave up the remain 50% registration rights to South Tyrol. but failed to bought back Alessandro Simonetta. On 19 August, he was transferred to Foggia in 1-year deal after a successful trial. He played 10 times in 2008–09 Lega Pro Prima Divisione and signed a new 2-year deal at the end of season. He made a breakthrough in 2009–10, played 32 times, replacing departed Andrea Lisuzzo.

Reggina
On 13 July 2010 Burzigotti received a call-up from Reggina and the transfer completed soon after. However, he only played 7 times. Burzigotti took no.5 shirt from Vincenzo Camilleri at the start of season.

On 12 January 2012 he left on loan to U.S. Latina Calcio.

Burzigotti wore no.16 shirt for Reggina in 2012 pre-season, which his old number was taken by Gianluca Freddi in January 2012. On 30 August 2012 Burzigotti was signed by Barletta.

Burzigotti returned to Reggio Calabria again on 1 July 2013. He did not have any shirt number for Reggina in 2013–14 Serie B. On 2 September 2013 Burzigotti and Francesco Bombagi were signed by Grosseto, with Valerio Foglio moved to opposite direction.

Amateur levels
On 31 January 2020, he moved to the amateur side Sansepolcro.

References

External links
 Reggina Profile 
 Football.it Profile 
 

Italian footballers
Serie B players
Serie C players
S.S. Arezzo players
S.S. Juve Stabia players
F.C. Südtirol players
Calcio Foggia 1920 players
Reggina 1914 players
F.C. Grosseto S.S.D. players
A.S. Gubbio 1910 players
Association football central defenders
Sportspeople from the Province of Arezzo
1987 births
Living people
Footballers from Tuscany